Poassa is a genus of Opiliones from the Manaosbiidae family. The scientific name of this genus was first published in 1943 by Carl Friedrich Roewer.

Species

Poassa is a Monotypic taxon and only contains the following species:

 Poassa limbata

References

Harvestmen